Morrisonia is a moth genus in the family Noctuidae.

Species
 Morrisonia confusa - Confused Woodgrain (Hübner, [1831])
 Morrisonia evicta (Grote, 1873)
 Morrisonia latex - Fluid Arches (Guenée, 1852)
 Morrisonia mucens (Hübner, [1831])
 Morrisonia triangula Sullivan & Adam, 2009

References
Natural History Museum Lepidoptera genus database
Morrisonia at funet

Orthosiini